Belgium was represented by Dream Express, with the song "A Million in One, Two, Three", at the 1977 Eurovision Song Contest, which took place in London on 7 May.

Before Eurovision

Eurosong 
The selection consisted of three semi-finals, followed by the final on 5 February. All the shows were hosted by Luc Appermont and took place at the Amerikaans Theater in Brussels.

Semi-finals 
Three semi-finals were held in which the three selected groups performed three songs each, with the songs being marked by audience members and the lowest-scoring being eliminated while the remaining two went forward to the final.

Final
The final was held on 5 February 1977. Voting was by 192 audience members awarding each song a score between 1 and 6 points. All six songs were performed and voted on then, rather oddly, the higher-scoring song from each act was performed and voted on again by the same 192 people. The contemporary, disco-influenced "A Million in One, Two, Three" emerged the winner, being the only song of the three to receive a significantly different score in the second round of voting, and beating the similarly styled "Drop Drop Drop" into second place.

At Eurovision 
The free-language rule which had applied in Eurovision between 1973 and 1976 was abolished by the European Broadcasting Union before the 1977 contest and participants were now obliged once again to perform in an official language of their country. However, as Belgium (along with Germany) had already chosen an English-language song and did not have a native-language version available, they were given dispensation to perform in English.

On the night of the final Dream Express performed 17th in the running order, following Finland and preceding the eventual winner France. At the close of the voting "A Million in One, Two, Three" had received 69 votes from 11 countries (including the maximum 12 from The Netherlands and 10 from the United Kingdom), placing Belgium 7th of the 18 entries. Although this was Belgium's highest placing since 1969 it was seen as something of a disappointment, as prior to the contest the song had been widely tipped as a contender for victory. The Belgian jury awarded its 12 points to the United Kingdom.

Voting

References 

1977
Countries in the Eurovision Song Contest 1977
Eurovision